In These Times is an American politically progressive monthly magazine of news and opinion published in Chicago, Illinois.
It was established as a broadsheet-format fortnightly newspaper in 1976 by James Weinstein, a lifelong socialist. 

It investigates alleged corporate and government wrongdoing, covers international affairs, and has a cultural section.  It regularly reports on labor, economic and racial justice movements, environmental issues, feminism, grassroots democracy, minority communities, and the media.

Weinstein was the publication's founding editor and publisher; its current publisher is Christopher Hass.

, it had a circulation of over 50,000. As a nonprofit organization, the magazine is financed through subscriptions and donations.

History
In 1976, Weinstein, an historian and former editor of Studies on the Left, launched the politically progressive journal In These Times. He sought to model the newsweekly on the early-20th-century socialist newspaper the Appeal to Reason.  For some time, its tagline was 'The Socialist Newsweekly'. "We intend to speak to corporate capitalism as the great issue of our time, and to socialism as the popular movement that will meet it" he told the Chicago Sun Times on the eve of the first issue's release.  While Weinstein himself was involved with both the New American Movement and the Democratic Socialist Organizing Committee, he wanted the journal to be independent of any one political party or faction.  Thus, over the years it has published a wide variety of contributorsfrom anarchists, to union members, to centrists.

During the 1980s, the publication won notoriety for its investigative reporting of the Iran–Contra affair. It has since broken stories on the deliberate destruction of Iraqi water treatment plants by US forces during the first Gulf War (1990-1991), global warming, and on the emergence of mad cow disease.

During the 1980s, and up to 1992, it was a biweekly newspaper and a democratic-socialist competitor to the National Guardian, which was a biweekly newspaper that was closer to Marxism–Leninism.

Senior editor Silja J. A. Talvi won two National Council on Crime and Delinquency PASS Awards (2005, 2006) for her reporting on the impact of three strikes sentencing on African-American men, and on the trend toward privatization of the prison system.

The magazine was awarded the Utne Reader Independent Press Award for Best Political Coverage in 2006.

Contributors
Two of the magazine's longest-running columns are Salim Muwakkil's The Third Coast, covering race relations, and Susan J. Douglas's Back Talk, a critical review of the mass media.

David Moberg has reported on labor and political economy for the magazine since its inception in 1976.

The magazine's editor Joel Bleifuss has written for it since the mid-1980s.  More stories from his column, The First Stone, have been included in Project Censored's "Top 25 Censored Stories of the Year" than of any other journalist.

Other columnists include H. Candace Gorman, Laura S. Washington and Terry J. Allen.

Senior editors include Allen, Patricia Aufderheide, Douglas, Moberg, Muwakkil and David Sirota.

Notable contributors to the magazine have included:

 Noam Chomsky
 Alexander Cockburn
 Barbara Ehrenreich
 Norman Finkelstein
 Laura Flanders
 Annette Fuentes
 Juan Gonzalez
 David Graeber
 Glenn Greenwald
 Miles Harvey
 Doug Ireland
 John Judis
 Garrison Keillor
 Naomi Klein
 Robert W. McChesney
 Rick Perlstein
 Jeffrey St. Clair
 Jane Slaughter
 James Thindwa
 Michael VanRooyen
 Kurt Vonnegut
 Joan Walsh
 Fred Weir
 Paul Wellstone
 Slavoj Žižek

See also

 List of newspapers in Illinois
 List of political magazines
 List of United States magazines
 Media in Chicago

References

External links
 , the magazine's official website (a portion of its content is available free of charge; yearly subscriptions are available for the full print edition)
 Fire on the Prairie podcast (active 2003–2006) with interviews and speeches from progressive leaders

1976 establishments in Illinois
Alternative magazines
Bimonthly magazines published in the United States
Monthly magazines published in the United States
News magazines published in the United States
Political magazines published in the United States
Magazines established in 1976
Magazines published in Chicago
Progressivism in the United States
Social democratic organizations
Socialism in the United States
Socialist magazines